Sporting Clube Ideal is a Portuguese sports club from Ribeira Grande.

The men's football team plays in the Portuguese District Championships, the fifth tier of Portuguese football. The team was promoted to the Campeonato de Portugal, then the third tier, for the 2015–16 season.

References

Football clubs in Portugal
Association football clubs established in 1931
1931 establishments in Portugal
Football clubs in São Miguel Island